SOR NS 18 is a low-floor articulated single-decker bus produced by bus manufacturer SOR from the Czech Republic since 2018. In many towns they will replace Karosa B 741 and Karosa B 941.

Construction features 

SOR NS 18 is derived from the SOR NS 12 rigid single-decker bus. It is made of two rigid sections linked by a pivoting joint. Engine and automatic transmission are located in the left rear corner of the bus. Inside are used plastic Ster seats. Rear axle is VOITH brand, as well as medium axle, the front axle is of its own production with independent wheel suspension. Only third C axle is propulsed, meaning that this articulated bus has pusher configuration. Body of the vehicle is welded from steel-voltage profiles, flashings from the outside and interior are lined with plastic sheeting. The floor of the bus is at a height of 340 mm above the ground. On the right side of the bus are four doors.

In Czechia are also produced trolleybus Škoda 33Tr SOR in Škoda Transportation, which are based on SOR NS 18 bodies.

Production and operation 
In 2018 SOR introduced in Prague on Czechbus. Articulated single-decker bus NS 18 was presented with their prototype after the prototype has done both test drive through cities in Czechia and Slovakia. From May 15th to June 3rd 2019, Bratislava became the first to test this bus. From December 6th 2019 to January 31st 2020, Hradec Králové leased this bus for tests.

References 

Buses of the Czech Republic
Buses manufactured by SOR
Articulated buses
Low-floor buses
Tri-axle buses